is a Japanese yuri manga written and illustrated by Pikachi Oui. Our Teachers Are Dating! was serialized in Ichijinsha's yuri manga magazine Comic Yuri Hime from 2018 to 2021 and was collected into four bound volumes. It was licensed for an English-language release by Seven Seas Entertainment in 2019.

Plot 
Azuka Hayama and Saki Terano, who fell in love for the first time as teachers, have just begun dating. They both have little experience with romantic relationships however with the help of their fellow teachers and students around them, they gradually deepened their relationship.

Characters 
Azuka Hayama
 The home-room teacher in charge of class 1-A. Her main subject is physical education. Hayama's usual personality is serious and stiff, but in front of Terano, she sometimes shows a stubborn side.

Saki Terano
 Deputy home-room teacher for class 1-A. Her main subject is biology. Due to her small physique, she is often mistaken for a student or child when she is with Hayama.

Bando Ryota 
 A colleague of Hayama and Terano. Her main subject is Japanese. Ryota is excited to learn about Hayama and Terano's new relationship and aims to support them.

Elena Miyazawa
 A colleague of Hayama and Terano. Her main subject is  English. Miyazawa is often trying to find out how  Hayama and Terano's relationship is progressing.

Media

Manga 
Our Teachers Are Dating! was licensed for an English-language release by Seven Seas Entertainment in 2019 as The Gym Teacher and School Nurse are Dating! but changed the title to its current name before the release of the first volume was released.

Reception 
Anime News Network gave the first volume an overall B grade, praising how the "yuri aspect is handled so matter-of-factly that it is a non-factor in the story" though noting that the character development outside of how the protagonists relate to each other is weak. Erica Friedman of Yuricon also praised the series for showing Hayama and Terano's relationship being supported by  all those around them without being up that they are both women, noting that "what we read this book and it’s following volumes for is the sheer joy Hayama-sensei and Terano-sensei take in one another’s company."

References

External links 
 

2018 manga
Ichijinsha manga
Seven Seas Entertainment titles
Yuri (genre) anime and manga
Teaching anime and manga
2010s LGBT literature
2020s LGBT literature